Robin Bowen may refer to:

 Robin E. Bowen, American college administrator
 Robin Huw Bowen (born 1957), Welsh harpist